Giver may refer to:

The Giver, a 1993 novel by Lois Lowry
The Giver (film), a 2014 American social science fiction film
"The Giver", a 2012 song by Duke Dumont from EP1
"The Giver (Reprise)", a 2015 remix
Giver (TV series), a Canadian program airing on TVOntario's TVOKids programming
Givers, an indie pop group from Lafayette, Louisiana

See also
Give (disambiguation)